Jan Hanuš may refer to:

 Jan Hanuš (composer), Czech composer
 Jan Hanuš (footballer), Czech footballer